Leoşti may refer to several villages in Romania:

 Leoşti, a village in Pădureni Commune, Vaslui County
 Leoşti, a village in Tătărăni Commune, Vaslui County